Etcetera Entertainment is an Indian film production and distribution company headed by V. Mathiyazhagan.

History
Etcetera Entertainment began producing and distributing Tamil films in 2015, notably working on Samuthirakani's Appa (2016) and Atharvaa's Semma Botha Aagathey (2018). The film also produced four films with actor Dhruvva in the lead role.

In 2019, the studio bought the rights of the long-delayed Kolaiyuthir Kaalam from Yuvan Shankar Raja's K Productions, and prepared the film for release. During the promotions for the film's release, the film's lead actress Nayanthara initially distanced herself from the project, calling it an "incomplete" film.

In the early 2020s, the studio ran into financial trouble following the failure of several of its films. Mathiazhagan filed a police complaint against Atharvaa for failing to compensate as promised for losses experienced during the making of Semma Botha Aagathey (2018). Atharvaa had initially committed to work on a venture titled Minnal Veeran by A. R. K. Saravan for Etcetera Entertainment free of cost, but later refused to do so. As a result of the financial trouble, Maha starring Hansika Motwani went through production hell before releasing belatedly in 2022. Prior to the release of the film, Madhiazhagan and the film's director Jameel publicly argued about whether the film was complete or not. Likewise, projects such as Arvind Swami's Pulanaivu and Arun Vijay's Boxer were indefinitely put on hold.

In June 2020, Mathiazhagan announced plans of working as an actor, and revealed that he would make his debut with a role in Boxer. He also revealed that he was working on a film co-starring Sathyaraj, choreographer Bobby Antony’s directorial debut, as well as on ventures by directors G. R. Adithya and Savari Muthu.

Filmography

As producer

As distributor
Eli (2015)
Vaalu (2015)
Pichaikkaran (2016)
Iru Mugan (2016)
Devi 2 (2019)

Reference

External links
Official website

Film production companies based in Chennai
2015 establishments in Tamil Nadu
Indian companies established in 2015
Mass media companies established in 2015